Evgeny Busygin (born September 9, 1987) is a Russian professional ice hockey player who currently plays for Metallurg Novokuznetsk in the Kontinental Hockey League (KHL).

External links

1987 births
Living people
HC Vityaz players
Russian ice hockey defencemen
HC CSKA Moscow players
Metallurg Novokuznetsk players